A rational difference equation is a nonlinear difference equation of the form
 
where the initial conditions  are such that the denominator  never vanishes for any .

First-order rational difference equation
A first-order rational difference equation is a nonlinear difference equation of the form

 

When  and the initial condition  are real numbers, this difference equation is called a Riccati difference equation.

Such an equation can be solved by writing  as a nonlinear transformation of another variable  which itself evolves linearly.

Equations of this form arise from the infinite resistor ladder problem.

Solving a first-order equation

First approach

One approach to developing the transformed variable , when , is to write
 

Further writing   can be shown to yield

Second approach

Then it can be shown that  evolves according to

Third approach

The equation

 

can also be solved by treating it as a special case of the more general matrix equation

 

where all of A, B, C, E, and X are n × n matrices (in this case n = 1); the  solution of this is

 

where

Application

It was shown in  that a dynamic matrix Riccati equation of the form

 

which can arise in some discrete-time optimal control problems, can be solved using the second approach above if the matrix C has only one more row than column.

References

Further reading

 Simons, Stuart, "A non-linear difference equation," Mathematical Gazette 93, November 2009, 500–504.

Algebra
Recurrence relations
Dynamical systems